Ramgarh Raj was the major Zamindari  estate in the era of the British Raj in the former Indian province of Bihar.
Territories which comprised the Ramgarh Raj presently constitute districts of Ramgarh, Hazaribagh,
Chatra, Giridih, Koderma, and Bokaro with 3672 villages. The entire area is rich in minerals like coal and mica and falls under the Indian State of Jharkhand. The First King was Maharaja Baghdeo Singh and the last ruling king was Maharaja Kamakhya Narain Singh of this estate, until
the estate was merged to the Republic of India. The revenue of the estate was about 3600000.

History
The areas that would later comprise the Ramgarh Raj (estate) had initially belonged to the Raja of Chhota Nagpur. Around 14th century Ghatwar king rebelled against Nagvanshi kings. King of Tamar attacked Khukhragarh the capital of Nagvanshis. Nagvanshi king sought help of Baghdeo Singh, the king of Khayaragarh. Baghdeo was made fauzdar of Karra Pargana. Baghdeo suppressed rebellion, killed the king of Tamar. After the job was done, the Raja did not render payment to them of the full promised amount. Later he killed king of Karnpura Karpurdeo and he declared himself as King of that region. Baghdeo Singh, who was anyway in control of the area after quelling rebellion, simply stayed on and declared himself Raja of that area, which is said to have been 22 parganas (districts) in extent.

During 17th century, Dalel Singh built a palace for defence against the Mughal Empire and shifted his capital from Badam  to Ramgarh. He built Kaitha Shiv Mandir dedicated to Lord Shiva in Kaitha, Ramgarh which was declared as a National Monument in 2016. He also wrote a book named Shiv Sagar.

During rule of Mughal Empire, Ramgarh Raj was paying tributes to Mughal. In 1772, Mukund Singh was not accepted suzerainty of East India company due to high amount of taxes. He made alliance with Maratha and defeated forces of Tej Singh Thakurai, Nagvanshis and Palamu with the help of Maratha forces.  But later he surrendered before company forces as he didn't get help from Maratha and accepted suzerainty of the East India Company. Then Tej Singh Thakurai was made king of Ramgarh Raj by Company.

Maharaja Bahadur Kamakhya Narain Singh (b. 1916, ruled 1919–47, d.1970) was the last ruling chief of the Ramgarh Raj. In 1945, he ceded control to the Indian government. His son, Maharaja Bahadur Indra Jitendra Narain Singh (1938–2008) had been the head of the family from 1970 to 2008. Maharaja Bahadur Saurabh Narain Singh has been head of family from 2008.

Rulers
Following is the list of King of Ramgarh Raj. 
Maharaja Baghdeo Singh 1368–1402
Maharaja Kirat Singh 1402–1459
Maharaja Ram Singh I 1459–1537
Maharaja Madho Singh 1537–1554
Maharaja Jagat Singh 1554–1604
Maharaja Himmat Singh 1604–1661
Maharaja Ram Singh II 1661–1677
Maharaja Dalel Singh 1677–1724
Maharaja Bishan Singh 1724–1763
Maharaja Mukund Singh 1763–1772
Maharaja Tej Singh 1772–1774
Maharaja Paras Nath Singh 1774–1784
Maharaja Mani Nath Singh 1784–1811
Maharaja Sidh Nath Singh  1811–1835
Maharaja Lakshmi Nath Singh 1835–1841
Maharaja Shambhu Nath Singh 1841–1862
Maharaja Ram Nath Singh 1862-1866
Maharaja Trilok Nath Singh 1866 
Maharaja Nam Narain Singh 1866–1899 
Maharaja a Ram Narain Singh 1899–1913
Maharaja Lakshmi Narain Singh 1913–1919
Maharaja Kamakhya Narain Singh Bahadur 1919–1953 (+1970)

Erstwhile Ruling Family  Genealogy

Maharaja a Lakshmi Narain Singh, married Rajmata Shashank Manjari Devi, 1914, a daughter of Raja Narpat Singh of Porahat
Maharaja Kamakhya Narain Singh, married Maharani Lalita Rajya Lakshmi Devi, 26th February 1917, daughter of Supradipta Manyabara Lt.Gen. Maharajkumar Singha Shumsher Jung Bahadur Rana of Nepal
Maharaja Indrajitendra Narain Singh, married  Maharani Rewa Singh, daughter of Raja Dinesh Singh of Kalakankar
Maharaja Saurabh Narain Singh Bahadur married, Maharani Ujvala Prabha
Rajkumar Vaibhav Narain Singh
Lt.Col.Dr. Maharajkumar Basant Narain Singh Bahadur, married Kunwarani Vijaya Raje Sahiba
Maharajkumar Mayurdhwaja Narain Singh , married Kunwarani Nivedita Shashi Prabha Singh
Rajkumar Udaybhan Narain Singh, married Kunwarani Divya Devi Singh
Rajkumar Rudra Narain Singh
Rajkumar Adhiraj Narain Singh, married Kunwarani Devyani Singh

References 

 Ramgarh Raj
  Genealogy of the chiefs of Ramgarh

External links
Jharkhand State Govial wvial w e
Tourism guide of Jharkhand state

Zamindari estates
History of Jharkhand
Rajput estates
Rathores
Ramgarh district